The Gobarau Minaret (var. Gobirau, Goborau) is a  minaret located in the center of the city of Katsina, northern Nigeria.  As an early example of Muslim architecture in a city known as a theological center, the tower has become a symbol of the city.

History
Gobarau is one of the largest buildings in West Africa, with its construction believed to have been completed during the reign of Sarkin Katsina (King) Muhammadu Korau (1398-1408 AD) -- the first Muslim King of Katsina.
Other sources dated the structure from the 16th to 18th centuries, with a major reconstruction taking place in the early 20th century.

Originally, built as the central Mosque of Katsina town, it was later used also as a school. By the beginning of the 16th century, Katsina had become a very important commercial and academic center in Hausaland, and Gobarau mosque had grown into a famed institution of higher Islamic education. Gobarau continued to be Katsina's Central mosque until the beginning of the 19th century AD when Sarkin Katsina Ummarun Dallaje (1805-1835) built a new mosque, which was later demolished by Muhammadu Dikko (1906–1944), who built the famous Masallacin Dutsi (Katsina Grand Central Mosque/Masallacin Juma'a na Kofar Soro), which is still used up to this day.

The mosque and its tower were renovated by Sarkin Katsina Muhammadu Kabir Usman (1981–2008).

Mythology
A popular myth about the origin of Gobarau states that when Muhammadu Korau slew Jibda-Yaki Sanau, the last pagan king of Katsina, he desired to construct a mosque. After the site was selected, there arose the problem of the direction of the Qiblah where the mosque must face. Muhammadu Korau consulted the Muslim scholars of that time, and they all agreed to a certain direction, except one Mallam Jodoma, who was a stranger. An argument broke out, and the other scholars insulted Jodoma of being a stranger who wanted to bring instability. Incensed, Mallam Jodoma pointed his staff at another direction, and there appeared the Ka'abah clearly. The tower was also used for spotting invading armies.

Muhammadu Korau was amazed, and made Mallam Jodoma his Chief Imam, much to the dismay of the other scholars, who jealously made Muhammadu Korau believe that Jodoma, becoming increasingly famous, wanted his throne. Jodoma was banished from Katsina, and he settled at Guga, a village in present-day Bakori Local government in Katsina state, where he died.

Tourism
Today Gobarau is a tourist attraction site, along with the Kusugu well in Daura.

References

"Gobarau Minaret." Encyclopædia Britannica. 2008. Encyclopædia Britannica Online. 24 Sept. 2008.
 Gobarau Minaret, the living past of Katsina, OSA AMADI, Business Day Nigeria, 12 September 2008.
Trip to Yar’Adua’s Village, MAURICE ARCHIBONG, Daily Sun, Nigeria, August 7, 2008.
http://www.katsinaemirate.org Retrieved 8 Apr. 2011.
https://web.archive.org/web/20111114170909/http://www.katsinaemirate.org/earlykt.htm Retrieved 8 Apr. 2011.

Mosques in Nigeria
Katsina
Historic buildings and structures in Nigeria
Sudano-Sahelian architecture